The Vicar of Bray is a 1937 British historical film with songs, directed by Henry Edwards, and starring Stanley Holloway, Hugh Miller, Felix Aylmer and Margaret Vines. These songs include the melody and first verse of the traditional English song which gives the film its title, along with a new verse on Cromwell's rule.

Premise
During a visit from his governor in Ireland the Earl of Brendon, Charles I asks advice on finding a new tutor for his wayward son Prince Charles and accepts Brendon's recommendation of the vicar of Bray, County Wicklow. On returning to Ireland Brendon passes on news of the appointment to the vicar, who travels to London to take up the post, promising to return one day. He falls asleep during his first lesson with the Prince, allowing the latter to slip away to see his actress lover Meg Clancy. The vicar follows the Prince and mildly reprimands him before they are reconciled.

Just before the outbreak of the English Civil War, the vicar heads back to Bray, gaining a promise from his friend the Prince that he will rule mercifully when he succeeds his father. Meanwhile the Royalist Brendon finally breaks from his Parliamentarian friend Sir Richard Melross, whose son Dennis seeks the vicar's help to be married to his childhood sweetheart Norah, Brendon's daughter. The vicar accepts but Brendon discovers and breaks up the wedding ceremony before it is complete. Sir Richard is killed in the war, Charles I is executed and Dennis and Oliver Cromwell find themselves in Ireland. In a meeting arranged by Dennis, the vicar uses his blarney to convince Cromwell that he is apolitical and thus worthy of exemption from a decree dismissing all clergy appointed by Charles I.

News of the imminent Restoration reaches Ireland and Dennis accepts the vicar's entreaties not to oppose it. However, he ignores his advice to flee straight to France and instead is captured in a failed attempt to spring Norah from Brendon's castle, before being sent to the Tower of London to await execution. The vicar and Norah manage to reach Dover, where the new king has just landed. The vicar reminds him of his promise to him just before the war and gains a pardon from him for Dennis, who swears loyalty to the new king.

Cast
 Stanley Holloway as The Vicar of Bray
 Hugh Miller as Charles I
 K. Hamilton Price as Prince Charles
 Felix Aylmer as Earl of Brendon
 Margaret Vines as Lady Norah Brendon, the Earl's daughter
 Garry Marsh as Sir Richard Melross
 Esmond Knight as Dennis Melross, Sir Richard's son
 George Merritt as Oliver Cromwell (uncredited)
 Martin Walker as Sir Patrick Condon, the Earl's Royalist ally and failed suitor to Norah
 Eve Gray as Meg Clancy, an actress and Prince Charles' lover
 Kitty Kirwan as Molly, the vicar's maid
 Tim Connor as a Fred O'Donovan, the vicar's servant

Critical reception
A 21st-century review in the Radio Times gave the film two out of five stars, writing "Mercifully this period drama is the kind of film they don't make any more, but it's not without moments of interest as a historical artefact," with the reviewer concluding "The songs are ghastly and the period trappings cheap and inaccurate, but Felix Aylmer and Garry Marsh go some way towards atoning for the film's deficiencies"; while TV Guide also rates it two out of five stars, noting "An entertaining role for Holloway, but the accompanying musical numbers are pretty sour."

References

External links

1937 films
British historical drama films
English Civil War films
Films set in Ireland
1930s historical drama films
British black-and-white films
Films directed by Henry Edwards
1937 drama films
Cultural depictions of Charles II of England
Cultural depictions of Charles I of England
1930s English-language films
1930s British films